The 1962–63 Danish 1. division season was the sixth season of ice hockey in Denmark. Five teams participated in the league, and Rungsted IK won the championship.

Regular season

External links
Season on eliteprospects.com

Danish
1962 in Danish sport
1963 in Danish sport